Daniel Grassl (born 4 April 2002) is an Italian figure skater. He is the 2022 European silver medalist, the 2022 MK John Wilson Trophy champion, the 2019 World Junior bronze medalist, and a four-time Italian national champion (2019–2022). He has won ten senior international medals, including gold at four ISU Challenger Series events (2018 CS Inge Solar Memorial – Alpen Trophy, 2019 CS Asian Open Trophy, 2019 CS Ice Star, 2021 CS Lombardia Trophy).

Career

Early years 
Grassl began learning to skate in 2009. His first coach was Ludmila Mladenova in Merano. He competed internationally in the advanced novice ranks from the 2012–2013 season through 2014–2015.

Making his junior international debut, Grassl won the bronze medal at the Lombardia Trophy in September 2015. He won his first Italian national junior title in December of the same year.

2016–2017 season 
During the season, Grassl trained in Egna, Italy, coached by Lorenzo Magri. In August 2016, he competed at his first ISU Junior Grand Prix (JGP) assignment in Saint-Gervais-les-Bains. After finishing 7th in France, he had the same result at his next JGP event, in Yokohama, Japan. In December, he repeated as Italy's national junior champion.

In February 2017, Grassl won silver at the European Youth Olympic Festival in Erzurum, Turkey.

2017–2018 season 
Coached by Magri, Grassl began his season on the JGP series, placing 6th in Brisbane, Australia, and then 7th in Egna, Italy. His senior international debut came in late October 2017 at the Golden Bear of Zagreb in Croatia; ranked first in both segments, Grassl outscored British champion Graham Newberry by 13.33 points for the gold medal. During his time in Croatia, he was the youngest skater ever to land a quad lutz. In November, he stepped onto two more senior international podiums, taking gold at the Ice Challenge in Austria (27.33 points ahead of silver medalist Javier Raya from Spain) and then bronze at the Merano Cup in Italy (where he finished behind Newberry and Raya).

2018–2019 season 
In August, Grassl won bronze at the ISU Junior Grand Prix in Slovakia. In October, he received the senior gold medal at the Golden Bear of Zagreb after becoming the first European to land a quad loop in international competition. In December, he outscored Matteo Rizzo by 4.48 points to become the Italian national senior champion.

Grassl next competed at his first European Championships, where he placed ninth in the short program and fifth in the free skate, for sixth place overall. As Rizzo won the bronze medal at Europeans, he was assigned to Italy's lone men's place at the 2019 World Championships, while Grassl was sent to the 2019 World Junior Championships.  He placed third in the short program, winning a bronze small medal, despite a minor error on his triple Axel.

2019–2020 season 
Grassl began his season on the Junior Grand Prix in Poland, where he won the bronze medal. His second event was the Italian JGP event, held in his home rink, where he won the gold medal, qualifying to the Junior Grand Prix Final. Moving to the senior level Challenger series, Grassl won both the Asian Open and the Ice Star.  

At the JGP Final in Torino, Grassl was the lone Italian skater to qualify at either the senior or junior level. Two days before the competition began, his right skate broke, which he attempted to remedy with tape. This proved inadequate in skating the short program, where he placed fifth after missing the second part of his jump combination. Grassl then replaced his skates with only a day's preparation and struggled in the free skate, finishing last among the competitors. Shortly afterward, he won his second consecutive Italian national title.

Returning to the European Championships, Grassl placed eleventh in the short program with multiple errors. Staging a comeback in the free skate, he was second in that segment with a new personal best score and rose to fourth place overall, under two points short of the silver medal.

Grassl placed sixth in the short program at the 2020 World Junior Championships in Tallinn, Estonia.  Grassl attempted the quad flip in competition for the first time in the free skate, underrotating both it and his quad Lutz, as well as a triple Axel.  He placed third in the segment, winning a small bronze medal, and was fourth overall, 1.74 points behind bronze medalist Petr Gumennik.  Grassl was scheduled to make his senior World Championship debut in Montreal, but these were cancelled as a result of the coronavirus pandemic.

2020–2021 season 
Grassl won the 2020 CS Budapest Trophy and was assigned to make his Grand Prix debut at the 2020 Internationaux de France, but this event was also cancelled as a result of the pandemic.

Grassl won his third consecutive Italian national title in December, after which he tested positive for COVID-19, as a result of which he was off the ice for a month and a half due to quarantine and subsequent concerns about the condition of his heart. Grassl was assigned to compete at the 2021 World Championships in Stockholm, where he placed twelfth. Grassl and Matteo Rizzo's placements qualified two berths for Italian men at the 2022 Winter Olympics in Beijing. They were both subsequently named to the Italian team for the 2021 World Team Trophy. Rizzo later withdrew due to a positive COVID test, as a result of which Grassl was the lone Italian man in the competition.  He was tenth in the short program and seventh in the free skate, while Team Italy finished in fourth place.

2021–2022 season 
Grassl began the Olympic season at the 2021 CS Lombardia Trophy on home soil. Fifth, after the short program, he won the free skate and took the gold medal. He then made his senior Grand Prix debut at the 2021 Skate America, where he placed seventh. His second Grand Prix assignment was initially the 2021 Cup of China, but following that event's cancellation, he was reassigned to a special home 2021 Gran Premio d'Italia in Turin. Grassl was second in the short program with a new personal best, dropping to third in the free skate to take the bronze medal overall. This was his first Grand Prix medal at the senior level, and he was the lone Italian medalist at the event. Afterward, he expressed a desire to "thank those people in the crowd who supported me."

Following his Grand Prix success, Grassl won another Challenger medal, silver at the 2021 CS Warsaw Cup. He then won a fourth consecutive Italian national title and was named to the Italian Olympic team.

Assigned to compete at the 2022 European Championships in Tallinn, Grassl placed fifth in the short program, seven points behind a trio of Russian skaters in the top three places. He placed second in the free skate, despite both of his triple Lutzes being called for incorrect edges, setting new personal bests in that segment and in total score and taking the silver medal.

Grassl began the 2022 Winter Olympics as the Italian entry in the men's short program of the Olympic team event. He placed fifth in the segment, securing six points for the Italian team. Subsequently, Team Italy did not advance to the second phase of the competition and finished seventh. Grassl next performed his short program in the men's event, coming twelfth. In the free skate, Grassl made only minor errors in a three-quad program, managing a new personal best that saw him fourth in that segment, rising to seventh overall. He deemed it "probably the best of the season."

Grassl concluded his season at the 2022 World Championships in a men's field considerably more open than usual due to the absences of Nathan Chen and Yuzuru Hanyu and the International Skating Union banning all Russian athletes due to their country's invasion of Ukraine. He finished fifth in the short program with a new personal best but dropped to seventh after the free skate.

2022–2023 season 
In August, before the start of the 2022–23 figure skating season, Grassl announced that he would be leaving Egna, Italy, where he had trained most of his life and relocating to Norwood, Massachusetts to train at The Skating Club of Boston under Alexei Letov and Olga Ganicheva.

Grassl was invited to be part of Team Europe at the Japan Open at the beginning of the season. On the Grand Prix, he placed fourth at the 2022 Skate America. He fared better at his second event, winning gold at the 2022 MK John Wilson Trophy, which result in turn qualified him for the Grand Prix Final, becoming the first ever Italian male figure skater to do so. A week later, he competed at the 2022 CS Warsaw Cup and won the silver medal, finishing less than half a point behind event champion Kévin Aymoz.

Shortly before the Grand Prix Final, Grassl announced that he had moved back to Egna to train due to homesickness. At the Final, Grassl finished in sixth place after placing fourth in the short program and fifth in the free skate. At the Italian championships shortly afterward, he finished in fourth place, missing the podium for the first time in five years. In the aftermath of these disappointments, Grassl began training in Moscow under controversial Russian coach Eteri Tutberidze. He would later say that he was finding it difficult to motivate himself to train after the Olympics, feeling that his time in Moscow had assisted him, but that he felt under pressure as "many people are against me and my decision" to train on Tutberidze.

Competing at the 2023 European Championships despite his fourth-place finish at the national championships, Grassl finished eighth in the short program after doubling a planned quad Lutz. He fell on his quad Lutz attempt in the free skate, and erred on two other jumps, but still rose to sixth overall. He indicated that he was undecided whether he would return for further training in Russia.

Records and achievements 
 At the age of 15, Grassl became the youngest person to land a quad Lutz jump in international competition (2017 CS Golden Spin of Zagreb). His record was broken by Stephen Gogolev in 2018.
 The first European skater to have completed a quad loop in international competition. He landed the jump in his free skate at the 2018 Golden Bear of Zagreb.

Programs

Competitive highlights 
CS: Challenger Series; JGP: Junior Grand Prix

Detailed results 
Small medals for short and free programs awarded only at ISU Championships. Current ISU world bests highlighted in bold and italic.

Senior level

Junior level

References

External links 
 

2002 births
Italian male single skaters
Living people
Sportspeople from Merano
World Junior Figure Skating Championships medalists
Figure skaters at the 2022 Winter Olympics
Olympic figure skaters of Italy

nds:Daniel Grassl